The Gedeo are an ethnic group in southern Ethiopia. The Gedeo Zone in the Southern Nations, Nationalities, and People's Region (SNNPR) is named for this people. They speak the Gedeo language, which is one of the Cushitic languages.

Overview 
According to the 2007 Ethiopian national census, this ethnic group has 986,977 members, of whom 75.05% live in the SNNPR and 24.84% in adjacent parts of the Oromia Region. Almost one in sixteen—6.24% -- live in urban areas.

Culture
The culture of the Gedeo is distinguished by two features. Beckingham and Huntingford describe the system as seven grades that span a 10-year period of birth, creating a 70-year cycle. Asebe Regassa Debelo provides oral traditions showing that the Gedeo acquired the practice from the Guji Oromo, with whom they have had, historically, a close relationship. On the other hand, their agricultural economy is based on cultivating ensete, as is their neighbors the Sidama people, whose language is closely related to theirs. From a geopolitical point of view, the Gedeo are Horners, and from an ethnic point of view, they are Cushites.

History 
The origin of the Gedeo is not well known. Tadesse Kippie Kanshie mentions one story in which the Gedeo trace their origin to the aboriginal tribe called Murgga-Gosallo, perhaps the earliest people to have lived in the area. Daraso is said to have had seven sons from two wives, from whom were descended the seven Gedeo clans: Doobba’a, Darashsha, Gorggorshsha, Hanuma, Bakarro, Henbba’a and Logoda. The  comprises more than twenty-five sub-tribes while the  consists of ten sub-tribes, all of which are exogamous. To these seven clans specific roles were attributed, which meant only a given clan or sub-clan contributed members from its ranks for the role of leadership while other clans or sub-clans performed duties associated with ritual, traditional medicine, etc. Accordingly, the Aba Gada used to be chosen from the Logoda and Henbba'a clans.

Incorporation into expanding Ethiopia empire in 1895 led to numerous social upheavals. In areas where the Gedeo "submitted peacefully" local administration was not disturbed, but in those that required military action, military governors ruled and at times became feudal lords. The incorporation seriously affected their socio-economic, political and cultural autonomy. For instance, the Gedeo were barred from using their  tradition in their day-to-day lives, except in religious rituals, leading to social disintegration, and loosened the social ties amongst the different tribes. The landlords emphasized production of coffee due to its importance as a cash crop—to the benefit of the landlords, not the Gedeo peasantry. The  also had to contribute  (one-tenth of the total produce) to the Ethiopian Church.

However, one authority holds that the greatest administrative action that changed the lives of the Gedeo was during the 1920s when measurement of land through  (a rope or leather thong about 66–67 meters long) was introduced. The process of measuring land brought many hitherto unoccupied lands, and formerly forested areas that had been under the control of the traditional authorities, into the hands of the national authorities. This forced the ordinary Gedeo to abandon their traditional lands where they grew ensete (as the landlords claimed  and  rights over measured lands), and towards peripheral areas in search of unoccupied and forested lands. This migration led to assimilation of different clans, eliminated traditional no-man's zones and encouraged clearing of forested areas for the purposes of growing mixed coffee and ensete.

Protestant missionaries arrived in the early 1950s. They established two churches, the Ethiopian Kalehiywot Church and Ethiopian Evangelical Church Mekaneyesus. Of these, the Ethiopian Kalehiywot Church attracted the bulk of the Gedeo population and exerted a far-reaching influence. The missionaries found their evangelical work quite easy, for they had only to substitute the Christian God for the Mageno, the Supreme Being of the Gedeo. Moreover, before the Christian missionaries arrived there was virtually no formal education among the Gedeo. The handful of government schools were in the towns. The missionaries quickly identified this gap and used it to their advantage, establishing Bible and elementary schools. Gedeo were so eager to learn how to read and write, that elementary schools had to offer evening classes for the adults, lit by kerosene lamps. As Tadesse Kippie Kanshie writes, "These schools not only taught religious cadres but also cadres of change."

The landlords, well aware of the consequences, were vehemently opposed to any education of the Gedeo, and worked against the efforts of the missionaries, by limiting their movement in the countryside in various ways. While the missionaries relied on the help of their converts to circumvent the effect of these limitations, the local elites also struck against them. Some, such as Murtti Obese, one of the first converts to evangelize to the Gedeo south of Dila, lost his life in 1970 while in the remote areas of Hagere Mariam woreda, and Tesfaye Argaw was murdered while on a similar mission in the lowlands.

Related to this was the effort of the Gedeo to regain their lost rights. In the 1950s, Gedeo elders were selected and presented a petition to Emperor Haile Selassie in Addis Ababa, but to no avail. The Gedeo clashed with the Ethiopian Army in 1960 at Michille hill near Dilla. With traditional weapons like spears against modern firearms, the Gedeo killed 68 government army and officials, while the latter killed 86 Gedeo peasants, "a small number considering the state’s level of military power," Asebe Regassa Debelo notes with some satisfaction. Nevertheless this defeat led to government persecution of local Protestants. Church leaders were accused of inciting the people against the feudal government and church gatherings were banned. Further, government authorities forcibly resettled Gedeo in Adola, Hagere Mariam (Bule Hora) and other Guji Oromo territories located far from the homelands of the Gedeo. While the fall of Emperor Haile Selassie at first led to improved conditions, such as land reform, but these improvements did not last. Cheating and deceiving had become "normal" ways used by most town merchants in dealing with Gedeo peasants. They were told by Political Commissars when to harvest, when to sell and whom to sell to, and these officials eventually tried to enforce agricultural collectivization on the Gedeo. In response, farmers clashed with government soldiers in 1981 near Rago-Qishsha.

Politics
Besides the  system, before their conquest by the Ethiopian Empire in the 1890s, the Gedeo lived in a federation of three territories called Sasserogo, or "three Roga". According to Gedeo tradition, all leadership positions from Aba Gada at the top down to the office of Hyiticha were assumed at the  ceremony, while specific roles were held by specific clans or sub-clans.

When boundary lines were drawn between the new SNNPR and Oromia administrative units during the Transitional Government of Ethiopia, much territory originally belonging to the Guji Oromo, including the Qallu compound in Wenago, was given to the SNNPR. The local Guji Oromo were dissatisfied with this arrangement, and unsuccessfully appealed the decision to the office of then Prime Minister. This led to violent clashes in Hagere Mariam woreda between the Guji and Gedeo in April–May 1995. The federal army attempted to intervene between the two to stop the fighting, but only succeeded in becoming the target of Guji militants.

Gedeo-Oromo clashes

Conflict between the Guji Oromo and the Gedeo people in Gedeo Zone since 2018 led to Ethiopia having the largest number of people to flee their homes in the world in 2018, with 45000 newly displaced people.

References 

Ethnic groups in Ethiopia
Cushitic-speaking peoples